The Central Area, Ipswich is one of five administrative areas in Ipswich, through which Ipswich Borough Council divides its spending and enables feedback from local residents, businesses and community groups.

The area is composed of three wards, each represented by three councillors. Each ward is also a Middle Layer Super Output Area (MSOA). As of the 2019 Ipswich Borough Council election, the councillors are as follows:

These Councillors form the Central Area Committee of which Julian Gibbs is the chair. They are joined by three Suffolk County Councillors:

The area is also covered by a Neighbourhood Watch network which comprises 35 neighbourhood watch schemes.

References

Areas in Ipswich
Central Area, Ipswich